The Maria Àngels Anglada Prize (in Catalan: Premi de Narrativa Maria Àngels Anglada) is a Catalan literary award, given annually by the Institut Ramon Muntaner ("Ramon Muntaner Secondary School"), in Figueres (Spain), with the aim of contributing to the promotion of Catalan literature, reaffirming the civic and cultural projection of the school and extolling the memory of the writer Maria Àngels Anglada (Vic, 1930 - Figueres, 1999), ex-professor of the centre. The award has the support of the Geli-Anglada family and the sponsorship of the Ajuntament de Figueres ("Figueres City Council") and the Diputació de Girona ("Girona Provincial Council"), as well as the collaboration of the Consell Comarcal de l'Alt Empordà ("Alt Empordà County Council").

Winners 

 2004: Emili Teixidor: Pa negre
 2005: Carme Riera: La meitat de l'ànima
 2006: Joan-Daniel Bezsonoff: Les amnèsies de Déu
 2007: Imma Monsó: Un home de paraula
 2008: Quim Monzó: Mil cretins
 2009: Joan Francesc Mira: El professor d'història
 2010: Màrius Carol: L'home dels pijames de seda
 2011: Sergi Pàmies: La bicicleta estàtica
 2012: Jaume Cabré: Jo confesso
 2013: Lluís Llach: Memòria d'uns ulls pintats
 2014: Rafel Nadal: Quan en dèiem xampany
 2015: Vicenç Pagès: Dies de frontera
 2016: Teresa Colom: La senyoreta Keaton i altres bèsties
 2017: Pep Puig: La vida sense la Sara Amat
 2018: Tina Vallès: La memòria de l'arbre
 2019: Joan-Lluís Lluís: Jo soc aquell que va matar Franco
 2020: Irene Solà: Canto jo i la muntanya balla
 2021: Miquel Martín Serra: La drecera
 2022: Alba Dalmau: Amor i no

References 

Maria Àngels Anglada
Awards established in 2004
2004 establishments in Spain